Dixons Broadgreen Academy is a coeducational secondary school and sixth form located in Liverpool, England. It was formerly known as Broadgreen High School, Broadgreen Community Comprehensive, and Broadgreen International School.

The school eventually converted to academy status in December 2021 and is now sponsored by the Dixons Academies Trust.

Transformation
Between 2003 and 2007, the school went under a major transformation. This has produced a number of new buildings within the school grounds which include a sports hall, a drama studio, bistro and dining room. The school was celebrated with a re-dedication ceremony presided by Prince Edward, the Earl of Wessex.

MUGA Redevelopment
On 15 March 2016, a new 3G Pitch was officially opened by the Liverpool F.C. player Kolo Touré, Liverpool L.F.C. Alex Greenwood and former Everton F.C. legend Graeme Sharp. The 54m x 43m 3G pitch replaced a concrete Multi-Use Games Area (MUGA). The new pitch was funded by a £269,093 grant from the Premier League and The FA Facilities Fund with the pitch costing £339,092 in total. The redevelopment of the pitch also included the provision of floodlights that allow the pitch to be used at night.

Sixth Form

 September 2022 - DBA switch their Sixth Form Courses to A-Level.

Sports
Broadgreen have been successful in sport over the last few years. Games such as football, basketball, hockey, and rugby have been played. The school offer sports for disabled, deaf, and blind children as well, such as boccia and curling, which they won both in 2017 (boccia and curling), and 2018 (boccia).

Ofsted Report
Between 11–12 December 2018, Ofsted carried out an inspection of the school's teaching standards and learning facilities. In its report of 5 February 2019, Ofsted found that the school was ‘inadequate’ and that special measures were required to improve standards. Following the report, the  authority conducted a monitoring visit in December 2019 which concluded that sufficient improvements had not taken place.

Notable former pupils
 Ross Barkley, footballer (Chelsea FC and England national team)
 Paul Deaville (Snooker player)

References

External links 
 Official Website
 Ofsted's Page for Broadgreen International School

Secondary schools in Liverpool
International Baccalaureate schools in England
Academies in Liverpool
Educational institutions established in 1934
1934 establishments in England